The 1918 Campeonato Nacional was the first official tournament of the Colombian football. It was only played by two teams from the city of Bogotá: Bartolinos, a team of the Colegio San Bartolomé, a state owned school ruled by the Jesuits, and Colombia FC. This was the only edition held for this competition, being replaced by the Categoría Primera A.

Standings

References 

1918
Col
1918 in Colombia